Shestak is an unincorporated community in Saline County, Nebraska, United States. The community is located on Nebraska Highway 103 three miles south of Crete. The Big Blue River flows past, approximately one-half mile to the east of the community.

History
Shestak had a post office from 1893 until 1894. The community was named for Václav Šesták, an early settler and native of Bohemia.

References

Unincorporated communities in Saline County, Nebraska
Unincorporated communities in Nebraska